Hirsutidin is an O-methylated anthocyanidin, a chemical compound belonging to the anthocyanins. It can be found in Catharanthus roseus (Madagascar periwinkle) where it is the prominent compound in petals and can also be found in callus cultures.

Glycosides 
3-O-(6-O-p-coumaroyl) glucoside of hirsutidin can also be found in Catharanthus roseus.

References 

O-methylated anthocyanidins